Barbershop in Germany (abbreviated BinG or BinG!) is the association for barbershop music in Germany. It was founded in October 1991 and has an official alliance with the US-based Barbershop Harmony Society.

Any representative of a German barbershop quartet or chorus can become a member of BinG, and individuals may also join as supporting members. The association began with two quartets and eight choruses. As of May 2020, membership included about 40 quartets, 20 choruses, and 800 individuals.

History
In 2001 BinG celebrated its 10th anniversary with a grand concert in the concert hall of the University of Münster. The country's first barbershop quartet, Sour Krauts, which had formed locally in 1963, performed at the anniversary concert.

Barbershop Blend became Germany's first ladies barbershop chorus in 1984, and Erster Kölner Barbershop Chor followed in 1987 as the first German men's barbershop chorus.

Maximilian Hilz is the first chairman of BinG. Manfred Adams was previously the president, having held the role in much of the 1990s and resuming leadership in 2004 until resigning in 2016. Adams is the musical director of the Ladies First chorus from Dortmund.

Champions
BinG organizes a biennial Barbershop Music Festival, which includes national and "World Mixed" championships for quartets and choruses. The association's national champions are:

{| class="wikitable"
|- style="background-color:#FF0000;font-weight:bold"
| Year || Chorus || Quartet || Venue city || Ref
|-
| 2022 || colspan="2" align="center" | Festival cancelled || Dortmund || 
|-
| 2020 || colspan="2" align="center" | Festival cancelled || Dortmund || 
|-
| 2018 || Harmunichs || SomeSing || Munich || 
|-
| 2016 || Harmunichs || Klangküsse || Munich || 
|-
| 2014 || Ladies First || Tonikum || Dortmund || 
|-
| 2012 || Ladies First || Klangküsse || Dortmund || 
|-
| 2010 || Ladies First || Klangküsse || || 
|-
| 2008 || Ladies First || Klangküsse || || 
|-
| 2006 || Harmunichs || Inflagranti || || 
|-
| 2004 || Barbershop Blend || Inflagranti || || 
|-
| 2002 || Ladies First || Splash! || || 
|-
| 2000 || Ladies First || Take Four || || 
|-
| 1998 || Ladies First || Splash! || || 
|-
| 1996 || Ladies First || Take Four || || 
|-
| 1995 || – || Take Four || || 
|-
| 1994 || Ladies First || Take Four || || 
|-
| 1993 || Ladies First || Viertakt || Cologne || 
|}

References

External links
Official website (English)
Ladies First, ten-time German Barbershop Music Festival champions
Harmunichs, three-time German Barbershop Music Festival champions

1991 establishments in Germany
Barbershop music
Cultural organisations based in Germany
German music
German musical groups
Music education organizations